Lennart Nelson (16 August 1918 – 11 September 2006) was a Swedish weightlifter. He competed in the men's middleweight event at the 1948 Summer Olympics.

References

1918 births
2006 deaths
Swedish male weightlifters
Olympic weightlifters of Sweden
Weightlifters at the 1948 Summer Olympics
Sportspeople from Västerås